Hylliebadet is a public swimming venue in Malmö city, Sweden, owned by the municipality of Malmö. It opened on 15 August 2015.

The swimming complex has an area of 11,500 m2, with one 50-metre pool, two training pools, family pools with water slides and a relaxation area with sauna, cold and warm water pools, and an outdoor pool. There is also a fitness area.

Built with 700 m2 solar panels on the roof and energy-saving solutions, Hylliebadet is self-sufficient in energy. It was designed by PP Arkitekter and built by NCC AB.

References

External links
 Hylliebadet 

Buildings and structures in Malmö
Swimming venues in Sweden
Sport in Malmö